Monnani is a village in Sivagangai District in the Indian State of Tamil Nadu. It has a population of over 100.

History
The name "Monnani" is derived from the Tamil word "Munnani". Monnani is now under the Karaikudi constituency following the reformation of constituencies. However, for parliamentary elections, it comes under the Sivaganga constituency.

Transport
Monnani is situated on Tiruchirappalli - Rameswaram National Highway Road (NH-210). The nearest airport is in Madurai and Trichy. The nearest Railway Station is located at Devakottai Rastha and Karaikudi.

Villages in Sivaganga district